|}

The John and Chich Fowler Memorial Mares Chase is a Grade 3 National Hunt chase in Ireland which is open to mares aged five years or older. 
It is run at Fairyhouse over a distance of 2 miles and 4 furlongs (4,023 metres), and it is scheduled to take place each year in January.

The race was originally run in honour of John Fowler, an amateur jockey and trainer (son of Bryan Fowler and brother of Jessica Harrington), who was killed in an accident at Rahinston in December 2008, Fowler's widow, Chich, died in 2013 and her name was added to the race title from that year.

The race was first run in December 2009, but from 2011 the name was transferred to the existing mares chase run at the Easter meeting.

The race was awarded Grade 3 status in 2012. It was moved to a date in January from the 2021 running.

Records
Most successful jockey (2 wins):
 Bryan Cooper - Coscorrig (2011), Scarlet And Dove (2023)

Most successful trainer (2 wins): 
 Nicky Henderson - Nadiya De La Vega (2013), Une Artiste (2014)  Willie Mullins–  Vroum Vroum Mag (2015), Camelia De Cotte (2019)  Joseph O'Brien -  Slowmotion (2017), Scarlet And Dove (2023) ''

Winners

See also
 Horse racing in Ireland
 List of Irish National Hunt races

References

Racing Post:

National Hunt races in Ireland
National Hunt chases
Fairyhouse Racecourse
Recurring sporting events established in 2009
2009 establishments in Ireland